Étienne Dorfeuille (26 December 1892 – 25 July 1962) was a French racing cyclist. He rode in the 1920 Tour de France.

References

External links
 

1892 births
1962 deaths
French male cyclists
Place of birth missing